Paul Richard Brydon is a former association football player who represented New Zealand at international level.

Brydon attended Nelson College from 1977 to 1980, playing for both the 1st XI cricket and football teams in 1979 and 1980.

Brydon made a solitary official international appearance for New Zealand in a 4–2 win over Fiji on 17 September 1986.

References

External links

Year of birth missing (living people)
Living people
New Zealand association footballers
New Zealand international footballers
Papatoetoe AFC players
People educated at Nelson College
Miramar Rangers AFC players
1960s births
Association football midfielders